The Woolooware Bay is a bay on the lower estuarine Georges River in southern Sydney, in the state of New South Wales, Australia.

Location and features
The bay is located near where the Georges River empties into Botany Bay, southeast of the Captain Cook Bridge. The bay's catchment area is bound by Botany Bay to the north, Bate Bay sub-catchment to the east, Gwawley Bay sub-catchment to the west and Port Hacking sub-catchment to the south. Mangrove swamps were traditionally located around the bay area. Some were reclaimed to create parks and playing fields including Endeavour Field (Toyota Park), Woolooware Golf Course and Cronulla Golf Course.

References

External links
 

Bays of New South Wales
Botany Bay